Achi-Su, also known as Achisu, is an urban locality (an urban-type settlement) in Karabudakhkentsky District of the Republic of Dagestan, Russia. As of the 2010 Census, its population was 1,679.

Administrative and municipal status
Within the framework of administrative divisions, the urban-type settlement of Achi-Su is incorporated within Karabudakhkentsky District as Achi-Su Settlement (an administrative division of the district). As a municipal division, Achi-Su Settlement is incorporated within Karabudakhkentsky Municipal District as Achi-Su Urban Settlement.

References

Notes

Sources

Urban-type settlements in the Republic of Dagestan